Never Shout Never is an American indie rock band, formed in Joplin, Missouri in 2007. The band has released 8 albums, 8 extended plays, and 24 singles.

Never Shout Never released their first extended play Demo-shmemo on February 29, 2008. On July 29, 2008, they released their second extended play, The Yippee through Loveway Records. The second extended play produced one single, "30days." From then on, Never Shout Never released a third extended play, Me & My Uke (Loveway Records) on January 27, 2009 and a fourth, The Summer (Loveway Records) on June 23, 2009. The Summer reached #57 on Billboard 200. The fourth extended play produced two singles, "Happy" and "On the Brightside". On December 8, 2009, Never Shout Never released their fifth and self-titled (Sire Records) extended play. It produced the single "Big City Dreams."

Never Shout Never released their first studio album What Is Love? (Sire Records) on January 26, 2010. It reached #24 on Billboard 200, #2 on Billboard Top Alternative Albums and Billboard Top Rock Albums. It produced "What Is Love?," "I Love You 5," and "Can't Stand It" as singles. On July 27, 2010, the band released their sixth extended play, Melody (Sire Records) and "Coffee and Cigarettes" was released as a single. Harmony (Sire Records) was released as the group's second studio album on August 24, 2010. Five singles were released that includes: "CheaterCheaterBestFriendEater," "Lousy Truth," "Lovesick," "Trampoline," and "Harmony." On September 20, 2011, Time Travel (Sire Records) was released. "Time Travel" and "Simplistic Trance-Like Getaway" were the singles for this album.

Their fourth album, Indigo, was released on November 13, 2012. The first single from the album, "Small Town Girl" was released in early 2012. The second, "Till the Sun Comes Up," debuted in April of the same year.

As of 2010, he has accumulated 1.3 million downloaded song sales according to the Nielsen Soundscan.

Albums

Studio albums

Extended plays

Live albums

Compilation albums

Featured albums

Singles

As lead artist

Promotional singles

As featured artist
 Blizzard of 89

Notes

References

Discographies of American artists
Alternative rock discographies